Yuquan Temple, formerly known as Palace of the Goddess, is a Buddhist temple located in Tianxin District of Changsha, Hunan.

History
Yuquan Temple was originally built in 1368, at the dawn of Ming dynasty (1368–1644).

In 1731, in the 9th year of Yongzheng period of the Qing dynasty (1644–1911), Zhang Fengyi, the local politician added a statue of Mazu to the temple and renamed it "Palace of the Goddess". It was repaired and renovated in 1789, during the reign of Qianlong Emperor. In 1852, it was restored after war. Termites bit the pillars of the halls of Yuquan Temple, it was refurbished in 1877, in the ruling of Guangxu Emperor.

In 2006, in order to support urban construction, the whole temple was relocated to Jinpenling of Tianxin District. The foundation-laying ceremony was held in February 2009. The construction of Yuquan Temple was completed in 2015.

Architecture
The temple consists of more than 10 buildings, including Shanmen, Bell tower, Drum tower, Mahavira Hall, and the Buddhist Texts Library and east and west annex halls.

The Mahavira Hall is the main hall in the temple. It was built in November 2012.

Gallery

References

Buddhist temples in Changsha
Tourist attractions in Changsha
21st-century establishments in China
21st-century Buddhist temples
Religious buildings and structures completed in 2015
Linji school temples